Egil Gjelland (born 12 November 1973) is a former Norwegian biathlete. He is olympic champion in the biathlon relay from the 2002 Winter Olympics in Salt Lake City.

Egil Gjelland grew up in Voss, the home of many world class biathletes, and started doing biathlon at the age of 15. He first entered the national team in 1996.

Gjelland's strength is in shooting. His greatest triumphs have come on Norway's relay team, where he was a regular feature for several years, thanks to his ability to keep his cool and deliver faultless shooting. In the 2002 Olympics in Salt Lake City, he won the gold medal on the relay, together with Ole Einar Bjørndalen, Halvard Hanevold and Frode Andresen. In the Biathlon World Championship 2005 in Hochfilzen, Gjelland again helped win the relay, Norway's first relay-gold in the world championships for 38 years. He won one race in the Biathlon World Cup, the pursuit in Östersund on 17 December 2004.

Egil Gjelland is a carpenter by trade. He married fellow biathlete Ann-Elen Skjelbreid in 2002. They have one daughter, Kristi (b. 2004). They live on her home farm, Skjelbreid, in Fusa in western Norway.

Since retiring from competition Gjelland has worked as a coach with the Norwegian biathlon team, and he was appointed as head coach for the Norwegian men's biathlon squad ahead of the 2014–15 season, having previously performed the equivalent role for the Norwegian women's team. In 2018 he was announced as head coach of the Czech women's biathlon team, becoming the first foreign coach to be employed by the Czech Biathlon Association alongside countryman and assistant coach to the men's team Anders Magnus Bratli.

Biathlon results
All results are sourced from the International Biathlon Union.

Olympic Games
2 medals (1 gold, 1 silver)

*Pursuit was added as an event in 2002.

World Championships
6 medals (2 gold, 3 silver, 1 bronze)

*During Olympic seasons competitions are only held for those events not included in the Olympic program.
**Team was removed as an event in 1998, and pursuit was added in 1997 with mass start being added in 1999 and the mixed relay in 2005.

Individual victories
1 victory (1 Pu)

*Results are from UIPMB and IBU races which include the Biathlon World Cup, Biathlon World Championships and the Winter Olympic Games.

References

External links
 
 
 
 
 Fansite for biathletes from Fusa

1973 births
Living people
People from Voss
People from Fusa
Norwegian male biathletes
Biathletes at the 1998 Winter Olympics
Biathletes at the 2002 Winter Olympics
Olympic biathletes of Norway
Medalists at the 1998 Winter Olympics
Medalists at the 2002 Winter Olympics
Olympic medalists in biathlon
Olympic silver medalists for Norway
Olympic gold medalists for Norway
Biathlon World Championships medalists
Cross-country skiing coaches
Norwegian sports coaches
Sportspeople from Vestland